{{Infobox person
| name               = Vandana Vithlani
| image              = 
| image_size         = 
| caption            = Vithani reprising her role as Kamini in Star Pluss Pandya Store in 2021
| birth_date         = 
| birth_place        = Mumbai, India
| nationality        = Indian, Gujarati
| education          = School - New Era High School, Panchgani, Maharashtra
College - Jai Hind College, Mumbai
| occupation         = Actress
| yearsactive        = 2010–present
| known_for          = Saath Nibhaana Saathiya  Sasural Simar Ka
| spouse             = Vidul Vithlani
| children           = 2
}}Vandana Vithlani is an Indian television actor known for her portrayal of Urmila Shah in the long running soap opera Saath Nibhaana Saathiya (2010–2017) on Star Plus.  In 2020, she had reprised her role as Urmila Shah in the second season of Saath Nibhaana Saathiya.

Personal life
Vithlani is married to actor Vipul Vithlani.

Career
Vithlani made her acting debut in television with Star Plus'''s one of the most longest running soap operas, Saath Nibhaana Saathiya (2010–2017), where she played the strong and important character of Urmila Shah for continuously 7 years from its beginning to closure.

After the end of Saath Nibhaana Saathiya in July 2017, she joined the cast of Colors TV's Sasural Simar Ka as the antagonistic and evil Bhairavi Dhanraj Kapoor until the series went off air in March 2018. In 2018, she had a recurring role in Star Bharat's thriller Kaal Bhairav Rahasya 2. In 2019, Vithlani appeared in Zee TV's Hamari Bahu Silk and Star Bharat's Muskaan.

In 2020, she made a cameo appearance in the sequel of Saath Nibhaana Saathiya, entitled Saath Nibhaana Saathiya 2 on Star Plus. In March 2021, she bagged the role of Kamini in Star Pluss Pandya Store. In August 2021, she bagged a prominent role in Tera Mera Saath Rahe as Ramila.

Television
 2010–2017: Saath Nibhaana Saathiya as Urmila Jitu Shah 
 2017–2018: Sasural Simar Ka as Bhairavi Dhanraj Kapoor 
 2018: Kaal Bhairav Rahasya 2 as Principal Hemangi
 2019: Muskaan 2019: Hamari Bahu Silk as Janki
 2020: Saath Nibhaana Saathiya 2 as Urmila Jitu Shah 
 2021–present: Pandya Store as Kamini Somendra Choudhry
 2021–2022: Tera Mera Saath Rahe as Ramila Anand Joshi 
 2022: Shubh Shagun as Archana
 2023: Chashni 2023: Kundali Bhagya TBA

Demand for payment
Vithlani alleged that the channel Zee TV did not pay her for Hamari Bahu Silk'' in 2019.

References

External links 
 

Indian television actors
Living people
1979 births